The second season of the American cable television series Legion is based on the Marvel Comics character David Haller / Legion, a mutant diagnosed with schizophrenia at a young age. The season is produced by FX Productions in association with Marvel Television. Noah Hawley serves as showrunner.

Dan Stevens stars as Haller, with Rachel Keller, Aubrey Plaza, Bill Irwin, Jeremie Harris, Amber Midthunder and Jean Smart also returning from the first season to star. They are joined by Jemaine Clement and Hamish Linklater, promoted from guest roles in the first season, and Navid Negahban. A second season of Legion was ordered by FX in March 2017, with filming for the season relocating from Vancouver to California, to take advantage of tax incentives. Production began in September 2017, with practical effects again a priority for the series' crew. The season features the parasitic Amahl Farouk / Shadow King, portrayed by Negahban, searching for his original body after being forced out of Haller's mind at the end of the first season.

The season premiered in Los Angeles on April 2, 2018, before its FX debut on April 3. It ran for 11 episodes, concluding on June 12. The series was renewed for a third and final season on June 1.

Episodes

Cast and characters

Main
 Dan Stevens as David Haller
 Rachel Keller as Sydney "Syd" Barrett
 Aubrey Plaza as Lenny Busker
 Bill Irwin as Cary Loudermilk
 Navid Negahban as Amahl Farouk / Shadow King
 Jemaine Clement as Oliver Bird
 Jeremie Harris as Ptonomy Wallace
 Amber Midthunder as Kerry Loudermilk
 Hamish Linklater as Clark Debussy
 Jean Smart as Melanie Bird

Recurring
 Marc Oka as Admiral Fukyama
 Jon Hamm as the Narrator
 Nathan Hurd as the Monk
 Katie Aselton as Amy Haller

 The Vermillion:
 Jelly Howie
 Brittney Parker Rose
 Lexa Gluck

Notable guests
 Quinton Boisclair as the Devil with the Yellow Eyes
 David Selby as Brubaker
 Lily Rabe as Joan Barrett

Production

Development
In June 2016, FX President John Landgraf said that Legion, if successful, could run for as many seasons as Hawley feels it needs to tell the story. In January 2017, Hawley said he was open to continuing the story past the first season, but didn't want the audience to get to the end of the first run and have "no resolution of any kind at the end of it." Star Dan Stevens said, "I know for a fact that there are more issues that David has to deal with than the one that we really address in the first season." FX renewed Legion for a second season on March 15, 2017. At the end of that month, Hawley explained that he planned for the season to have ten episodes, and to focus more on the series' other characters in addition to David Haller. He added, "I do tend to think that that's important, that even though the show isn't an anthology like Fargo, each season has a self-contained-ness to it, an identity to it. But I think it's a little too early to talk about what that identity might be." The season order was later expanded to eleven episodes, as announced by FX in May.

Writing
Hawley noted that the first season was about Haller's internal struggle against the Shadow King, and that the latter's transference to the character Oliver Bird at the end of the season signified a change to an external struggle for Haller that this season would explore. Hawley wanted to avoid having a villain-of-the-year structure, with the second season introducing a new antagonist, instead wanting to continue the story surrounding the Shadow King from his introduction in the first season that "makes for a potential showdown that we're really invested in as an audience". Hawley added that with the Shadow King reveal at the end of the first season, Haller can now blame "every bad thing he's ever done on the entity that's now gone, and now is thinking, 'I'm just a purely good person'... there's sort of a hubris to that." Stevens said that "we haven't even really scratched the surface of the number of characters or entities that are contained within [Haller]. The Shadow King was obviously one of them, and a large part, but there's a lot more going on." Hawley did not have a plan for the second season when he ended the first on a cliffhanger, and enjoyed the challenge of developing the story from that point, noting that this was the first "true" second season he has created. Hawley did not have to repeat this at the end of the second season, as he had a plan for future seasons by that point.

The second season begins a year after the end of the first, with Hawley feeling the time jump allowed them to "muddy the waters" rather than be "all clarity all the time", since "that's the fun of the show, the mystery of trying to figure things out." Stevens added that "everybody's going to be playing catchup", including the audience and Haller. Hawley also said that the season would explore the world of heroes and villains, and that it was not yet decided which direction Haller would go. The season spends more time inside the minds of the characters and in the Astral Plane than the first, and also explores "more specific genres and storytelling moments" to both be more ambitious than the first season and not repeat what had been done before; Hawley wanted to "use the genre to solve the characters ... to explore the characters and stories that you couldn't in a straight drama". The main story of the season focuses on Farouk searching for his original body, since mutant abilities are genetic and being reunited with the body will make him even more powerful. The season includes some episodes that Hawley considered "more stand-alone", that are still relevant to the plot of the season but were less interested in the plot and more character-focused. This was something Hawley had not been comfortable doing during the first season due to introducing the "different than everything else"-series to audiences then.

To avoid the season becoming "a good versus evil or white hat versus black hat situation", Hawley wanted to focus on thematic ideas such as "our shared reality being a choice that we make. Sometimes societies go a little bit crazy. How does that happen?" To help explore that idea, Hawley created an "educational segment" which he soon decided to add to each episode of the season. The segments are narrated, and are intended to "take these concepts of mental illness, and visualizing them in a way where you can tell a story."

Casting
Returning from the first season to star are Stevens as David Haller, Rachel Keller as Sydney "Syd" Barrett, Aubrey Plaza as Lenny Busker, Bill Irwin as Cary Loudermilk, Jeremie Harris as Ptonomy Wallace, Amber Midthunder as Kerry Loudermilk, and Jean Smart as Melanie Bird. Hawley considered Barrett to be the co-protagonist of the season alongside Haller, calling it a "two-hander", with the season further exploring their relationship and comparing it to that of Melanie Bird and her husband Oliver. Hamish Linklater joins the main cast, having portrayed Clark Debussy in a guest role in the first season.

With the end of the first season establishing the importance of Jemaine Clement's character Oliver Bird, now the host of the villainous Shadow King, Hawley said that he had talked to the actor about the next season, and that he was "excited to come back". Clement's return was confirmed in July 2017, also being promoted to the main cast, along with the announcement that Saïd Taghmaoui had been cast as the true form of the Shadow King / Amahl Farouk, succeeding Plaza who played the character using the appearance and persona of Busker in the first season. In November, during production on the season, Taghmaoui announced that he was no longer involved with the series, and FX confirmed that "a decision was made to recast" the role of Farouk. Navid Negahban was revealed to have taken over the role in January 2018. Hawley explained that Taghmaoui had not been "a great fit", leading to the recast. Negahban joins the main cast as well.

Jon Hamm narrates the educational segments throughout the season. Hawley did not want the narration to feel "tainted" by having one of the series' characters give their own point of view, and wanted an actor who could give "a sense of identity and a feeling of control [as if] the show itself has a point of view and it's all going somewhere". He compared the voice that he wanted for the narration to Alec Baldwin's from the film The Royal Tenenbaums, and considered Hamm—who he thought had "a great voice"—after working with him on the film Pale Blue Dot. Hamm agreed to take on the role, and Hawley thought he gave the segments "such character", comparing the final performance to Rod Serling. Hawley added that he was "pretty confident" the actor would only be providing his voice to the series rather than ever appearing onscreen.

Quinton Boisclair was confirmed to be returning as the Devil with the Yellow Eyes in July 2017. Katie Aselton also returns from the first season in a recurring role as David's sister Amy, before her body is infused with Busker's DNA allowing that character to return to life.

Design
New costume designer Robert Blackman continued the theme of mixing 60s and modern-day fashion. While each character's outfits were updated, the color palette for each character mainly stayed the same: Barrett wears orange and black in addition to yellow (with Keller saying black represents her character's "protective barrier"); and both Cary and Kerry Loudermilk wear navy and tan. Notable changes include: Melanie Bird's style changing to comfort clothing to portray her mourning in Oliver Bird; Wallace's suits featuring more color and floral designs at times; Busker's swimsuits showing how the character is being used and abused by the Shadow King; and Farouk sporting three-piece suits. Haller's style becomes more British punk, drawing inspirations from Sid Vicious and Johnny Rotten to portray a character coming from one mental institution to another. The season also moves Haller's hair closer to its unique look from the comics, with Stevens saying "it creeps ever higher". 

To create the sound of teeth chattering, for the people afflicted with the Catalyst mental virus, Hawley allowed sound supervisor Nick Forshager experiment with different approaches. Simply recording the actors on set chattering their teeth "didn't have that biting sound that we really needed", so they experimented with alternative sounds like horse hooves. They ultimately found that any sound they produced close to teeth chattering came across as fake teeth, so they tried recording the teeth of the sound department's staff in different ways. The final version used in the series was recorded with a Neumann condenser microphone and then digitally manipulated to give it a "kind of eerie multilevel sound".

Production designer Michael Wylie worked to continue the "all time" setting of the series in the second season, taking inspiration from styles and architecture across decades so as not to make the show appear as if it takes place in a specific time or place. Because much of the season takes place in Division 3 headquarters, Wylie wanted to clearly distinguish the sets from those used for Summerland in the first season by changing a recurring motif: circles were used a lot throughout the designs of the first season, and hexagons are throughout the season two sets. He thought this added some "familiarity" to the sets and made things "easier to design, and we also know that whenever you see a hexagon that you know you are in Division 3 without anyone having to tell you". Because of the tendency for a government facility to become "unbearably sterile", Wylie looked to add depth to the sets with custom-made wall paper and complicated floor designs which did not go so far as to make the spaces feel personalized.

The robot-like Vermillion that Division 3 leader Admiral Fukyama communicates through have feminine physiques and mustaches. They went through several variations, with Hawley wanting their look to be based on Dennis Franz. The set in which the Admiral and the Vermillion are introduced was initially going to look like a larger version of the wicker basket that Fukyama wears. The Division 3 dining hall is based on Hawley's idea of a "sushi-go-round" restaurant but with the food on boats floating in water, with Wylie's final design labelled a "1970s Italian waterpark version". The water for the boats zig-zags through the set, causing issues for the crew trying to maneuver around the room. Also built was Cary Loudermilk's "lair", the series' take on a traditional superhero lab, which includes an "amplification chamber" that is an homage to the machine Cerebro that appears in the comics and films. It is based on research into isolation tanks rather than any designs originating in the comics to prevent the series from simply copying what came before.

Filming
For the season, Hawley looked to move production of the show from Vancouver to California to better accommodate his busy schedule. This was made possible when the show was awarded over $11 million in tax incentives by the California Film Commission under its "Program 2.0" initiative. Hawley called this change of locale "another way that we helped the show not settle into a sort of familiar routine of standing sets and that sort of overly familiar sense of it's the same thing, week in and week out." He added, "I'm going to try and look at southern California in a way that we haven't looked at before, to try and find a way to tell stories that are urban and rural and in the astral plane as it were, and continue to look like nothing else." Filming began on September 28, 2017. The opening sequence of the season was filmed in the backyard of a Hollywood Hills home, in the sun, clearly establishing the different setting from the overcast locations of the first season.

As with the first season, Hawley was committed to emphasizing practical effects when creating the season's visuals. This included creating physical title cards to be filmed rather than digitally adding lettering. Hawley also wanted to explore alternative representations of the usual elements found in superhero series, such as depicting a fight sequence as a dance battle, explaining, "A fight is a very black and white, two-dimensional thing. We're fighting and I'm trying to beat you and you're trying to beat me. But what if the scene is... part of it is peacocking and part of it is a courtship dance and part of it is fighting because 'I hate that I have to work with you' etc. You can't express that in a fight sequence, but in a dance fight you can." Negahban joined the series during production on the eighth episode following the recasting of the Shadow King, and had to reshoot all of the scenes from the first seven episodes featuring the character. Filming for the season took place in a desert.

Music
Composer Jeff Russo stated in April 2017 that he would begin work on the season, including developing new thematic material, in June after he completed work on the third season of Fargo.

A soundtrack album for the season featuring Russo's score was released digitally on May 25, 2018. All music by Jeff Russo, except where noted:

A second album for the season was released August 17, featuring classics reimagined by Russo. Hawley, who pitched song ideas to Russo, provided lead vocals, with Russo backing on harmony vocals and various instruments including the Moog Synthesizer IIIc. Creating the covers were a "unique way to help propel the story,” Russo stated, “All of them have lyrical significance and we thought it would be a great idea to do them in the style of the show's music.” The deluxe edition of the album features a cover of "Behind Blue Eyes" as performed in "Chapter 19" by Dan Stevens and Navid Negahban and a cover of "Road to Nowhere" by Rachel Keller from "Chapter 2" in season one. All music performed by Noah Hawley and Jeff Russo, except where noted:

Shared universe connections
For the second season, Hawley wanted to further explore the connections between the series and the wider X-Men universe, particularly in paralleling common elements found throughout the universe such as the "gray approach to morality and how characters can cross that line, like Magneto." This was something Hawley felt was unique to this universe, and "not the same kinda black and white universe that you get in other comic franchises, and so I really wanted to play with that." The season also continues to explore Haller's father, Charles Xavier, though Hawley was reluctant to confirm an appearance by one of the X-Men film actors (Patrick Stewart or James McAvoy) reprising that role for the show since he felt incorporating elements directly from the films "too quickly" was "cheating on some level", rather than telling his own standalone story first.

Release

Broadcast
The season began airing on FX on April 3, 2018, and consisted of eleven episodes. Hawley had previously said, in March 2017, that he expected the season to begin airing in February 2018.

Marketing
Footage from the season debuted at the FX Television Critics Association panel in January 2018, introducing Negahban as Farouk in an announcement of his casting. Hawley and several cast members attended the panel. A trailer for the season was released online at the start of March, and multiple commentators noted that it indicated the noteworthy aspects of the first season would be retained for the second—an unreliable narrative, "stunning" visuals, and significant cast members including Stevens, Plaza, and Clement. The dancing featured in the trailer and the introductory footage of Negahban were also highlighted.

An artistic video installation created by Marco Brambilla Studio was open to the public at Goya Studios in Los Angeles from March 30 to April 1, 2018. It consisted of a chamber that several people could be sealed in, with a "moving kaleidoscope of imagery from the series" then displayed on screens around the chamber and onto a series of mirrors above to "completely envelope you in a very trippy, very Legion manner". The images were backed by music, and included teases of the second season. Visitors to the exhibit could also get their photo taken with a series of mirrors that evoked the style of promotional posters released for the season. A "blue carpet" premiere event was held for the season on April 2, at the Directors Guild of America headquarters in Los Angeles.

Reception

Ratings

Critical response
The review aggregator website Rotten Tomatoes reported an 89% approval rating for the second season, with an average rating of 7.66/10 based on 30 reviews. The website's critical consensus reads, "Legion returns with a smart, strange second season that settles into a straighter narrative without sacrificing its unique sensibilities." Metacritic, which uses a weighted average, assigned a score of 85 out of 100 based on 10 critics for the season, indicating what the website considers to be "universal acclaim".

Accolades
For the 70th Primetime Creative Arts Emmy Awards, Dana Gonzales received a nomination for Outstanding Cinematography for a Single-Camera Series (One Hour) for the episode "Chapter 9".

References

External links
 
 

2018 American television seasons
02